Amir Karara (born 10 October 1977) is an Egyptian actor and TV presenter. His real beginning came during his presentation of Star Maker in 2003. Karara is best known for his dramatic and action roles such as his roles in Karmouz War (2018), Horob Edtirari (2017) and Special Operations (2007). His most important series including Kalabsh (2017), Al Tabbal (2016) and Hawari Bucharest (2015). Karara's recent films have grossed high box office revenues. His series Kalabsh with all its parts, achieved great success in Egypt, where he became famous under the name "Basha Masr"  or "Pasha of Egypt".

Early life 
Amir Karara was born on 10 October 1977 in Cairo. He graduated from Faculty of Tourism and Hotels, department of tourism, but he did not work in a profession related to his studies. He was a volleyball player and participated in the main national volleyball team in Egypt. He entered world championships in volleyball, but did not continue in the field of sports.

Personal life 
Karara married Hend Salah Hosny, sister of footballer and actor Ahmed Salah Hosny, in 2006. They have 3 children: Selim, Laila and Nelly.

In December 2020, Karara announced that he had tested positive for COVID-19. In January 2021, he announced his recovery from it after 16 days.

Career 

Karara's artistic beginning was in the field of television advertisements. He used to play small roles in the Egyptian advertisements. Until he was discovered by the Egyptian businessman Tarek Nour and presented his first program Star Maker in 2002. In the same year, he participated in the sitcom Youth Online and in the second season in 2003.

After that, Karara's artistic works continued, including The Best of Times (2004), Zaky Chan (2005), Special Operations (2007) and Kasablanka (2019).

Karara starred as Sleim El-Ansary in the Egyptian drama series Kalabsh, which was released during Ramadan 2017. The second season was released in Ramadan 2018 and the third season in Ramadan 2019. In 2020, he portrayed Ahmed Mansi in the Egyptian biographical drama series Al Ekhtiar.

Works

Films

Series

Programs

References

External links 
 

1977 births
21st-century Egyptian male actors
Egyptian male actors
Egyptian male film actors
Egyptian male television actors
Egyptian Muslims
Egyptian nationalists
Egyptian television actors
Living people
Male actors from Cairo